The Cologne Marathon (Köln-Marathon) is an annual marathon held in Cologne, Germany. Since October 1997 the marathon has been held annually in early October, except for 2004, 2005 and 2014 when it was held in late September.

History 

The 2020 in-person edition of the race was cancelled due to the coronavirus pandemic, with all registrants given the option of obtaining a refund (minus an administration fee).

Course

Since 2013 the course starts at Ottoplatz in Deutz and leads the runners through the city of Cologne and finishes at Komödienstraße beneath the Cologne Cathedral.

The marathon time limit is 6 hours.

Events and categories
From the beginning there has also been a contest for inline skaters.  They start ahead of the runners and try to finish the course in the time limit for skaters, which is 2:30 hours. This competition as well as all others including inline skates were ultimately held in 2013.

Since 1998 there has also been a contest for handcyclists.

In the last years it has been more and more difficult to utilize the starting field because of diverse interests.  To countervail, the management of the marathon created new events and contests, which all take place at the same course on the same day.

Here is a list of all competitions:
 Marathon – 
 Half marathon – 
 Inline marathon – for skaters
 Handcyclist marathon
 Run  – a full marathon plus a half marathon
 Run&Skate  – first run a half marathon and afterwards skate a complete marathon
 Run&Skate  – first skate, and then run with the peloton
  of Cologne – run  (half marathon), skate , run 
 School Relay – schools may set up their own relay teams, the handover is at fixed points
 Cultural Relay – any group of people that is committed to any kind of cultural activity (e.g. carnival groups), may set up relay teams (again with fixed handovers). These teams are often dressed up specially.

Winners 

Key: Course record (in bold)

Marathon

Half marathon

Development of starting field

Notes

References

External links

 Cologne Marathon
 Marathon Info
 Course maps from 1997 to 2016

Recurring sporting events established in 1997
Marathons in Germany
Sport in Cologne
Tourist attractions in Cologne
Autumn events in Germany
1997 establishments in Germany
Inline speed skating competitions